In compiler theory, dependence analysis produces execution-order constraints between statements/instructions.  Broadly speaking, a statement S2 depends on S1 if S1 must be executed before S2.  Broadly, there are two classes of dependencies--control dependencies and data dependencies.

Dependence analysis determines whether it is safe to reorder or parallelize statements.

Control dependencies 
Control  dependency is a situation in which a program instruction executes if the previous instruction evaluates in a way that allows its execution.

A statement S2 is control dependent on S1 (written ) if and only if S2s execution is conditionally guarded by S1. S2 is control dependent on S1 if and only if  where  is the post dominance frontier of statement . The following is an example of such a control dependence:

 S1       if x > 2 goto L1
 S2       y := 3   
 S3   L1: z := y + 1

Here, S2 only runs if the predicate in S1 is false.

See data dependencies for more details.

 Data dependencies 

A data dependence arises from two statements which access or modify the same resource.

 Flow(True) dependence 

A statement S2 is flow dependent on S1 (written ) if and only if S1 modifies a resource that S2 reads and S1 precedes S2 in execution. The following is an example of a flow dependence (RAW: Read After Write):

 S1       x := 10
 S2       y := x + c

 Antidependence 

A statement S2 is antidependent on S1 (written ) if and only if S2 modifies a resource that S1 reads and S1 precedes S2 in execution.  The following is an example of an antidependence (WAR: Write After Read):

 S1       x := y + c
 S2       y := 10

Here, S2 sets the value of y but S1 reads a prior value of y.

 Output dependence 

A statement S2 is output dependent on S1 (written ) if and only if S1 and S2 modify the same resource and S1 precedes S2 in execution.  The following is an example of an output dependence (WAW: Write After Write):

 S1       x := 10
 S2       x := 20

Here, S2 and S1 both set the variable x.

 Input dependence 

A statement S2 is input dependent''' on S1 (written ) if and only if S1 and S2 read the same resource and S1 precedes S2 in execution. The following is an example of an input dependence  (RAR: Read-After-Read):

 S1       y := x + 3
 S2       z := x + 5

Here, S2 and S1'' both access the variable x.  This dependence does not prohibit reordering.

Loop dependencies 

The problem of computing dependencies within loops, which is a significant and nontrivial problem, is tackled by loop dependence analysis, which extends the dependence framework given here.

See also
 Program analysis (computer science)
 Automatic parallelization
 Automatic vectorization
 Loop dependence analysis
 Frameworks supporting the polyhedral model
 Hazard (computer architecture)
 Program slicing
 Dead code elimination

Further reading 
 
 
 

Static program analysis